Arthur Edmund Muskett  (15 April 1900, Norwich – 22 October 1984, Belfast) was a British phytopathologist and mycologist. He is noteworthy as a broadcaster who contributed to the Ulster Garden radio programme and as the president of the British Mycological Society for a one-year term from 1948 to 1949.

Education and career
Muskett grew up on his father’s farm close to the village of Ashwellthorpe, about 20 km S.W. of Norwich. After education at the City of Norwich School, he joined in 1918 the Royal Air Force and served for a year as a pilot. In 1919 he matriculated at Imperial College London. There he studied chemistry for 2 years, before John Bretland Farmer persuaded him to switch to botany. Muskett graduated in 1922 with a B.Sc. in botany from Imperial College London. 

In 1923 Muskett moved to Northern Ireland. In the department of agricultural botany of Queen's University Belfast (QUB) he was an assistant from 1923 to 1926, an assistant lecturer from 1926 to 1928, and a lecturer from 1928 to 1941. In QUB's department of mycology and plant pathology, he was a lecturer in charge of the department from 1941 to 1945. He was a professor of agricultural plant pathology at QUB from 1945 to 1966, when he retired as professor emeritus. Simultaneously with his appointments at QUB, Muskett held at the Ministry of Agriculture, in its Seed Testing and Plant Disease Division, a junior appointment from 1923 to 1931, an appointment as deputy head of the Plant Pathology Division from 1931 to 1938, and head of the Plant Pathology Division from 1938 until his retirement. He received in 1938 a D.Sc. from the University of London.

Muskett was the author or coauthor of about 70 scientific articles. In the 1930s and 1940s he did research on seed-borne diseases of oats, flax, and ryegrass. His research on plant pathology was practical and oriented toward the needs of agriculturalists in Ulster. He did research on the control of apple scab and (with H. Cairns and T. N. Greeves) on potato diseases. After WW II, Muskett was in charge of setting up QUB's Plant Pathology Field Station and shipping to Africa and southern Europe thousands of tons of potato seed tubers, which QUB's field station tested and found free from viral contamination.

In 1967 Muskett published an article Plant Pathology and the Plant Phytopathologist, giving a summary of the history and possible future trends of phytopathology, as well as its status in the 1960s. In the 1980s he published, with coauthor J. P. Malone of the Plant Pathology Division, Department of Agriculture for Northern Ireland, a series of 6 articles giving a catalogue of Irish fungi.

Muskets was an outstanding lecturer on botany, mycology, and horticulture. He was interested in environmental conservation and in 1957 founded Northern Ireland's Best Kept Towns 
awards.

In 1957 Muskett was appointed Officer of the British Empire. In 1985 Muskett’s former students and colleagues at QUB founded the Arthur Muskett Prize, which is awarded for outstanding academic achievement to a student enrolled in QUB's School of Biological Sciences.
 In October 2016 at a ceremony at QUB, Dame Mary Peters unveiled a plaque dedicated to Alfred Edmund Muskett.

A. E. Muskett and his wife had a son Bryan and a daughter Doreen. In 2008 Doreen Muskett was appointed Member of the British Empire (MBE).

Selected publications

Articles

Books and monographs

References

External links
 
 

1900 births
1984 deaths
20th-century British botanists
British mycologists
British phytopathologists
Alumni of Imperial College London
Alumni of the University of London
Academics of Queen's University Belfast
Officers of the Order of the British Empire
Presidents of the British Mycological Society